The 5th Armored Division was an armored division of the French Army that fought in World War II and the Algerian War. It was also active in Germany during the Cold War.

World War II
The division was formed on 1 May 1943 under the command of Brig. Gen. Henri-Jacques-Jean-François de Vernejoul. It was initially the 2nd Armored Division, but renamed the 5th Armored Division on 9 July.  The Division was a critical part of the French 1st Army under General Jean de Lattre de Tassigny, and came ashore with the U.S. 6th Army Group, under Lt. Gen. Jacob Devers, in the Operation Dragoon invasion of southern France in August 1944.  The 5th Armored Division particularly distinguished itself in the assault and capture of Stuttgart, Germany in April 1945.

Cold War
During the Cold War, the division was initially stationed in Germany; its HQ was in Landau, Palatinate.

Algeria
The division left Germany for Algeria on 1 April 1956, but left some units in Palatinate, Germany.

In 1961 the division comprised:
 1st Armored Regiment
 6th African Chasseur Regiment
 11th African Chasseur Regiment
 19th Chasseur Battalion
 20th Chasseur Battalion
 21st Algerian Rifles Regiment
 1st/64th Artillery Regiment
 2nd/64th Artillery Regiment

Return to Germany
The division was recreated in 1978 at Landau, Germany as a part of the 2nd Army Corps (Baden-Baden). The French Army in Germany was drastically reduced after the end of the Cold War; the 5th was dissolved on 31 June 1992.

References

5
Armored divisions of France
Military units and formations established in 1943
Military units and formations disestablished in 1962
Military units and formations established in 1978
Military units and formations disestablished in 1992